Yang Yuhua is a male former Chinese international table tennis player.

He won a bronze medal at the 1983 World Table Tennis Championships in the men's doubles with Wang Huiyuan.

See also
 List of table tennis players
 List of World Table Tennis Championships medalists

References

Chinese male table tennis players
Table tennis players from Beijing
World Table Tennis Championships medalists